The Croatia women's national under-20 volleyball team represents Croatia in international women's volleyball competitions and friendly matches under the age 20 and it is ruled by the Croatian Volleyball Federation That is an affiliate of International Volleyball Federation FIVB and also a part of European Volleyball Confederation CEV.

Results

FIVB U20 World Championship
 Champions   Runners up   Third place   Fourth place

Europe U19 Championship
 Champions   Runners up   Third place   Fourth place

References

External links
Official website

National women's under-20 volleyball teams
Croatia national volleyball team
Women's volleyball in Croatia